Gowry Lekshmi (born 2 August 1993) is an Indian composer, singer, songwriter, and music producer from Cherthala, Kerala.

Early life
She is from Cherthala, a village in Alappuzha of Kerala. She studied in St. Mary of Leuca Senior Secondary School. She did BA Music course in RLV College of Music and Fine Arts, Thrippunithura and further mastering the same with MA from Kerala University.

Career 
Gowry Lekshmi began her film career at the age of 13 by composing a song for the Malayalam film Casanovva. Director Rosshan Andrrews, who liked her song "Sakhiye", used it in his Mohanlal-starrer Casanova that came out in 2012. She was only 13 when she composed the song. The song was used in the movie when she was 15. As the youngest composer in India, Gowry's work was much appreciated and got wide media coverage then. Gowry is a holder of the Performer's Certificate from Trinity College London.

Gowry made her debut as a playback singer for music director Prasanth Pillai in the film Ezhu Sundara Rathrikal, followed by the song "Kalam Padunne" for Rex Vijayan in the film Lord Livingstone 7000 Kandi. Since then she has sung in a number of films in Malayalam and Tamil. Her breakthrough as a singer came when she sang the song  "Aaro Nenjil" in the Malayalam film Godha. I

In 2015, Gowry produced her debut independent music video titled Thoni, who was also her first single, written, composed and sung by herself. It received positive response.

Gowry Lekshmi is crowdfunding her new video, a new initiative in Malayalam indie music Aararo. She has performed in Kappa TV Music Mojo, and has released nearly 15 own compositions.

Settled in Chennai, she divides her time between her band and making new compositions, some of them with her husband and drummer, Ganesh Venkitaramani. Besides Ganesh, the others in her band are Isaac Dharmakumar, John Praveen and Godfrey Immanuel.

Discography

Films

Singles / Music videos

Albums

References 

https://www.onmanorama.com/entertainment/music/2020/11/02/noorin-shereef-music-video-teaser-ente-naadu-released.html

External links
 
 

1993 births
Living people
Indian women composers
Indian women singers
Indian women songwriters
Indian women playback singers
Women record producers
Indian record producers